Perthida tetraspila is a moth of the family Incurvariidae. It was described by Oswald Bertram Lower in 1905. It is found in South Australia and Victoria.

References

Moths described in 1905
Incurvariidae